Thae Byong-ryol (1916-December 29, 1986), General of the Korean People ’s Army (April 1992). On October 1980 elected by the First Plenary Session of the 6th Central Committee of the Workers' Party of Korea he was elected a member of the Central Military Commission. Thae Byong-ryol served as a member of the central Committee from October 14, 1980 until his death. He has at least one son named Thae Hyong-chol, who is the president of Kim Il Sung University.

Biography
In 1936, 20-year-old Thae Byong-ryol participated in the anti-Japanese activities led by Kim Il Sung. In March 1970, he was awarded the title of Hero of the Republic . He was elected as a member of the Central Military Commission of the Workers’ Party of Korea in 1980 and served there until his death. In October 1985, he served as the director of the Memorial Hall of the Victorious War Museum which commemorates the Day of Victory in the Great Fatherland Liberation War until he died on December 29, 1986. In April 1992, he was awarded the rank of General of the People's Army (Daejang).

Awards and honors 
A photo of Thae shows Thae wearing the ribbons to all decorations awarded to him.

References

North Korean generals
Workers' Party of Korea politicians
Korean independence activists
1916 births
1986 deaths
People of 88th Separate Rifle Brigade
People from North Hamgyong
People from Myongchon County